The Roggan River is a tributary of the eastern shore of James Bay. This river runs westward in the municipality of Eeyou Istchee Baie-James (municipality), in the administrative region of Nord-du-Québec, in Quebec, in Canada.

Geography 

The Roggan River flows south and parallel to the Seal River; as well as north and parallel to the Piagochioui River.

This lake is located west of Robert-Bourassa Reservoir.

In its course towards the west (in the direction of James Bay, the Roggan River escapes to form several important lakes, including: Lorin, Pamigamachi and Roggan.

The waters of the river will flow into an archipelago of islands on the northeast coast of James Bay in the hamlet of Roggan River.

Toponymy 
A written source indicates that in 1828 this river was designated by the name of "Pishop Roggan". The spelling "Bishoproggin R.", later "Bishop Roggan River" (meaning "Bishop Roggan's River"), appears on Arrowsmith British North America's map (1822). According to J. Keith Fraser, in "Place Names of the Hudson Bay Region (1968)", the term "Bishoproggin" is an anglicization of the Cree words "pichipouian" or "peshipwaytok" which means "fish tank". However, no source shows a toponymic link with the country's clergy or religious history.

Locally, the Crees designate this watercourse "Amistustikwach", which means "three rivers".

The toponym “Rivière Roggan” was formalized on December 5, 1968, at the Bank of Place Names of the Commission de toponymie du Québec, i.e. at the foundation of this commission.

See also 

 Jamésie
 List of rivers of Quebec
List of Hudson Bay rivers
List of rivers of Canada

Notes and references 

Rivers of Nord-du-Québec